The second series of the British version of The Masked Dancer premiered on ITV on 3 September 2022, and concluded on 22 October 2022. The series was won by actress Heather Morris as "Scissors", with actor Adam Garcia finishing second as "Onomatopoeia", and dancer/choreographer Bruno Tonioli placing third as "Pearly King".

Production
Following the conclusion of the first series in May 2021, Katie Radcliffe, head of entertainment at ITV, stated that the show "may not return for a second series" and that the broadcaster were considering axing a number of shows on the channel, deeming the future of The Masked Dancer uncertain. However, in December 2021, it was confirmed that the show would return for a second series. Filming for the series took place at ITV Studios Bovingdon in May 2022. On 24 August 2022, it was announced that the series would premiere on 3 September.

Panellists and host

In May 2022, it was announced by ITV that Joel Dommett would return to present the series, whilst Jonathan Ross, Davina McCall, and Oti Mabuse would return to the panel. Mo Gilligan was unable to return due to other commitments, former footballer Peter Crouch was announced as his replacement. Gilligan returned as a guest panellist for the sixth episode of the series. John Bishop, a guest panellist in the previous series, appeared in the seventh episode and in place of the absent Ross for the final. Dawn French also joined the panel for the final.

Contestants
The twelve celebrity costumes for the series were announced in July 2022, including the series' first duo costume, with two celebrities competing together as "Pillar and Post".

Episodes

Episode 1 (3 September)
 Group number: "Starstruck" by Years & Years

Episode 2 (10 September)
 Group number: "Good Times" by Ella Eyre

Episode 3 (17 September)
 Group number: "You Should Be Dancing" by Bee Gees

Episode 4 (24 September)
Group Number: "Turn the Beat Around"/"Conga"/"Get on Your Feet" mix by Gloria Estefan

Episode 5 (1 October)

Episode 6 (8 October)

Episode 7: Semi-final (15 October)

Episode 8: Final (22 October)
 Group number: "Everybody Dance" by Chic

 After dancing to their individual songs in the Ultimate Dance Jam, Onomatopoeia and Scissors concluded their battle dancing to "Let's Go" by Calvin Harris simultaneously.

Notes

References

The Masked Dancer (British TV series)
2022 British television seasons